Ji Gang (born 9 February 1969) is a Chinese sport shooter who competed in the 1988 Summer Olympics.

References

1969 births
Living people
Chinese male sport shooters
Running target shooters
Olympic shooters of China
Shooters at the 1988 Summer Olympics
Shooters at the 1990 Asian Games
Asian Games medalists in shooting
Asian Games gold medalists for China
Medalists at the 1990 Asian Games
20th-century Chinese people